2 Chronicles 9 is the ninth chapter of the Second Book of Chronicles the Old Testament in the Christian Bible or of the second part of the Books of Chronicles in the Hebrew Bible. The book is compiled from older sources by an unknown person or group, designated by modern scholars as "the Chronicler", and had the final shape established in late fifth or fourth century BCE. This chapter belongs to the section focusing on the kingship of Solomon (2 Chronicles 1 to 9). The focus of this chapter is Solomon's fame and wealth with the visit of the queen of Sheba and the list of his treasures, ending with the report of his death and the history books containing his activities.

Text
This chapter was originally written in the Hebrew language and is divided into 31 verses.

Textual witnesses
Some early manuscripts containing the text of this chapter in Hebrew are of the Masoretic Text, which includes the Aleppo Codex (10th century) and Codex Leningradensis (1008.

There is also a translation into Koine Greek known as the Septuagint, made in the last few centuries BCE. Extant ancient manuscripts of the Septuagint version include Codex Vaticanus (B; B; 4th century), and Codex Alexandrinus (A; A; 5th century).

Old Testament references
: 
: 
:

The queen of Sheba's visit (9:1–12)
The story of the Queen of Sheba's visit to Jerusalem was almost identical with that in 1 Kings 10 and fits extremely well for international recognition of Judah's rulers in the Chronicles (cf. e.g. 1 Chronicles 14:17).

Verse 9

And she gave the king one hundred and twenty talents of gold, spices in great abundance, and precious stones; there never were any spices such as those the queen of Sheba gave to King Solomon.
Around the middle of the first millennium BCE, the Sabaeans were recorded to dwell in the Horn of Africa, the area that later became the realm of Aksum. In the New Testament Gospels, she was referred to as the "queen of the South", who "came from the uttermost parts of the earth", i.e. from the extremities of the then known world, to hear the wisdom of Solomon (Mt. ; Lk. ).

Solomon's wealth (9:13–28)
This section with substantial information regarding Solomon's splendor and power largely parallels with 1 Kings 10:14–28a, describing how the promise of unmatched wealth and wisdom (2 Chronicles 1:11–12) was fulfilled in Solomon. Verse 25a corresponds with 1 Kings 5:6, verse 25b with 1 Kings 10:26b, whereas verse 26 includes information recorded in 1 Kings 5:1 and verses 27–28 with 1 Kings 10:27–28. Some materials in 1 Kings 10 with no parallel in this chapter can be found in 2 Chronicles 1:14-17.

The death of Solomon (9:29–31)
The Chronicles report that Solomon enjoyed a peaceful reign of unified Israel kingdom from the beginning to the end ('from first to last'; instead of 'all that he did' in 1 Kings 11:41), omitting any negative information found in other documents (1 Kings 9:11–16; 11:1–38) and also not to present Solomon's wisdom as his most significant quality. Instead of using 'the Book of the Acts of Solomon', the Chronicles use 'the history of the prophet Nathan, and in the prophecy of Ahijah the Shilonite, and in the visions of the seer Iddo concerning Jeroboam son of Nebat' – three prophetic sources just like David (1 Chronicles 29:29) – covering the beginning of Solomon's reign (Nathan, cf. 1 Kings 1), to its end (Ahijah; cf. 1 Kings 11:29), whereas Iddo is mentioned again as a source in 2 Chronicles 12:15 (Rehoboam) and 13:22 (Abijah).

See also

Related Bible parts: Deuteronomy 32, 1 Kings 1, 1 Kings 5, 1 Kings 9, 1 Kings 10, 1 Kings 11, 1 Chronicles 22, 1 Chronicles 29, Matthew 12, Luke 11

Notes

References

Sources

External links
 Jewish translations:
 Divrei Hayamim II - II Chronicles - Chapter 9 (Judaica Press) in Hebrew and English translation [with Rashi's commentary] at Chabad.org
 Christian translations:
 Online Bible at GospelHall.org (ESV, KJV, Darby, American Standard Version, Bible in Basic English)
 2 Chronicles Chapter 9. Bible Gateway

09